Enzo Dieci (born 28 January 1934) is an Italian prelate of the Roman Catholic Church, who left Rome in December 2009 and currently serves 35 km from Lima in the Church of the Sagrado Corazon de Jesus.
Born in Sassuolo, Dieci was ordained to the priesthood on 17 March 1962.

On 7 April 1992 he was appointed Titular Bishop of Maura and an Auxiliary Bishop of Rome. Dieci received his episcopal consecration on the following 26 April from Pope John Paul II, with Cardinals Franciszek Macharski and Angelo Sodano serving as co-consecrators.

As an auxiliary of Rome, he assists the Cardinal Vicar, currently Agostino Vallini, in the day-to-day administration of the diocese, which is delegated to him by the Pope. Dieci also serves as delegate for Missionary Cooperation among Churches.

External links
Catholic-Hierarchy
Vicariate of Rome - in Italian

1934 births
Living people
20th-century Italian titular bishops
21st-century Italian titular bishops
Bishops in Lazio
Dieci, Enzo